Nars or NARS may refer to:
Karl Nars (1874–1952), Finnish industrialist
Natural Area Reserves System such as the Natural Area Reserves System Hawaii
North Atlantic Radio System, a troposcatter communications system for the air defence of NATO's North-Eastern flank
NARS Cosmetics
NARS (gene) (Asparaginyl-tRNA synthetase, cytoplasmic), an enzyme in humans
Nested Arrays Research System, an extension of the APL programming language such as NARS2000

See also 
 Nar (disambiguation)